The Pellicanolibri editions is a publishing house founded in 1976 in Catania by the poet and writer Beppe Costa, with the specific intent to highlight authors and discover forgotten or unknown youth.

Story 
Pellicanolibri editions was created with the help of some academics: Gastone Manacorda, Giuseppe Barone, Antonino Recupero, Salvatore Lupo.
It isn't born with the only purpose of publishing, but with the strong and specific intent to introduce in Italy (up to 85 in Sicily), Italian and foreign authors.

From 1978 to 1996 the contribution of Dario Bellezza, gives life to the series Inediti rari e diversi, with authors like Angelo Maria Ripellino, Anna Maria Ortese, Alberto Moravia.
Public, among others, books by Fernando Arrabal, Arnoldo Foà, Ruggero Orlando, Melo Freni, Luce d'Eramo, Federico de Roberto, Antonio Uccello, Stefano Bottari, Leopold Sedar Senghor, Léo Ferré, Goliarda Sapienza, Gregory Corso, Adele Cambria, Giacinto Spagnoletti, Mario Vargas Llosa.

Pellicanolibri was the first publishing house in Italy to publish Manuel Vázquez Montalbán (author later become famous as a writer of thrillers).
In 1992 continued the business with a great cultural center and bookstore (directed by his son Dante) in a suburb of Rome. 
In 2008, Pellicanolibri public another work by Fernando Arrabal La scampagnata.

Publications

Series: Inediti rari e diversi 
  1982 Lettere libertine, :it:Riccardo Reim
  1983 Il trionfo dello sciamano, Gianfranco Rossi
  1983 Il treno russo, :it:Anna Maria Ortese
  1984 Forza Etna!, pref. Alberto Bevilacqua, Enzo Grasso
  1984 :it:Romanzo Siciliano, Beppe Costa
  1984 La tempesta, Alberto Moravia
  1984 Fuori rotta, :it:Renzo Paris
  1985 Gente d'Europa, Jeph Anelli
  1985 Colosseo Apologia di teatro, Dario Bellezza
  1985 Vivere con i diavoli Mario Marconato
  1985 L'immagine la memoria il tempo, Egidio Cacciola
  1985 Doppio deserto, :it:Tommaso Di Francesco
  1985 I triambuli, :it:Elio Pecora
  1986 Nudo di donna con rovine, :it:Adele Cambria
  1986 La gondola di Tiziano, :it:Riccardo Reim
  1986 I sogni ricorrenti di Biagio Balestrieri pref. di   Roberto Pazzi, Gianfranco Rossi

  1987 Fatto d'amore, Beppe Costa
  1987 La stagione della violenza, Enzo Grasso
  1987 Le vergini folli, Grazia Lago
  1987 Estivi terrori, :it:Anna Maria Ortese
  1987 Scontraffatte chimere, :it:Angelo Maria Ripellino
  1987 Le certezze del dubbio, :it:Goliarda Sapienza
  1989 Impaginato per affetto, Beppe Costa
  1990 Le pompe di satana, Arnoldo Foà
  1990 Contrappunti PerVersi - Antologia poetica, Autori Vari
  1990 Contrazione, Patrizia Lettieri
  1990 Il grido della chimera, Gabriella Zappalà
  1990 Non fotografate gli oleandri, Enzo Grasso, pref. Dacia Maraini
  1991 Le gemelle, Egidio Cacciola
  1991 Canti e poesie, Claudio Cundari
  1991 La formica, Arnoldo Foà
  1991 Esodo allo specchio, Vittorio Napoli La Rocca
  1991 Le tartarughe, Massimo Muratori
  1991 Poesie vecchie e nuove, :it:Ruggero Orlando
  1991 ConVersiAmo - Antologia poetica, Autori Vari
  1991 Geografia del cuore, Fiammetta Selva
  1992 L'inutile errante, Adriano Angelini
  1992 Le calde stagioni, :it:Melo Freni
  1992 Vapori, Luigi Galamini di Recanati
  1992 Marocco (viaggio con io), Domenico Tolomei
  1992 Amore sbendato, :it:Federico Verdinois
  1992 Che ne sai povero poeta? (logoritmi), Franco Zagato
  1994 Sotto il trono del pavone, Rocco Giudice
  1994 Fuga possibile, Antonello Stefanini
  1994 Mafia una favola vera, Filippo Feo
  1984 Disabitati cieli  (poesie 1965-1994), Fiammetta Selva
  1995 Due o forse più cose che so di lei, Beppe Costa
  1995 Poesia visiva multimediale, De Ioanna, Scarpa
  1996 Penisole (poesie), Imma Libertino
  1996 Cerchi concentrici, Antonello Stefanini
  1996 Racconti neri e grotteschi, Mario Ricotta
  1997 Ombre nell'eden, Ignazio Cassaniti
  1997 Raskolnikov e il marxismo, Luce d'Eramo
  1997 Er cazzabuglio (poesie), Giovanni Plini
  1998 La gabbia e il corvo, Antonella Lupidi
  2002 Poesie per chi non sa fare altro, illustration by Daniela Riccioli, Beppe Costa
  2002 Poesie per chi non sa fare altro, illustration by Daniela Riccioli, Beppe Costa
  2008 La scampagnata, Fernando Arrabal

Series: La nave dei folli 

 1978 Panico, Fernando Arrabal, Alejandro Jodorowsky, Roland Topor
 1978 1977: Autonomia/Organizzazione, Nino Recupero
 1979 Dieci anni in piazza, :it:Franco Trincale
 1979 Al magnifico rettore, Ninello Nerpa
 1980 Manifesto subnormale, Manuel Vázquez Montalbán
 1981 Dalla luna calanco lucana il mare, Mario Marconato
 1982 Il gran cerimoniale, (translation by Beppe Costa), Fernando Arrabal
 1982 Metamorfosi di un concetto astratto con accompagnamento di ottavino, preface of Dario Bellezza, Beppe Costa
 1984 Bello l'amore mio che se ne andò in marina with an interview of Salvatore Samperi, :it:Riccardo Reim

Series: I Tascabili 
 1992 L'innocenza e altri racconti afterword by Alberto Moravia, Dario Bellezza
 1992 Il male felice, Beppe Costa
 1992 La costituzione di Prinz, Arnoldo Foà
 1992 Storia di Rico, Luigi Reina
 1993 Un amore a Spoleto, :it:Melo Freni

Series: Visioni e immaginazioni 
 1980 La casa di Icaro pref. di Carlo Muscetta, :it:Antonino Uccello
 1981 Poesie poesie erotiche lu veru piaceri favuli, Domenico Tempio
 1984 Monumenti svevi di Sicilia, :it:Stefano Bottari
 1984 Arte a Catania 1921 1950, Giuseppe Frazzetto
 1985 Pittore tra la Sicilia e l'Europa, Jano Barbagallo
 1985 Catania, with 152 illustrations, Federico de Roberto
 1988 I due imperi di Roma, Luigi Pareti
 1988 Teatro, Mario Ricotta
 1989 Si conta e si racconta, Luigi Capuana
 1990 Un'ombra sull'Europa: La tragedia dell'Irlanda del nord, Enzo Farinella

Series: Prima Impaginazione (poems and prose) 

 1984 Vilipendio alla tolleranza, Giovanni Arcuri
 1984 Nei preparativi del volo, Giuseppe Frazzetto
 1984 In cielo, Alvaro De Angelis
 1984 Come quando, Domenico Agnello
 1984 Angeli, Enzo Salsetta
 1984 Morire a rate, Angelo Cirignotta
 1985 L'occhio dell'ape, Vincenzo Crapio
 1986 Pece, Francesco Rivera
 1986 Il porto del cielo, Georges de Canino
 1986 Lo sguardo finito, Gianni Busco
 1986 Candida suite, Santino Cicala
 1987 Una stagione in purgatorio, Franco Vitaterna
 1987 Sperando con rabbia, Giuseppe Lizza
 1987 Teresa e le amiche, :it:Francesco Scrima
 1988 Il dolore infinito, Jeph Anelli
 1988 Per incantamento, Antonello Cuzzaniti
 1989 La finta macchia, Carmelo Zaffora
 1989 A colloquio con io, Elena Andrei

Series: Saggi 
 1978 I chierici traditi interventions on contemporary literature, :it:Sebastiano Addamo
 1978 La filosofia del non, Gaston Bachelard
 1978 Potere e violenza nel romanzo italiano del seicento, Donata Ortolani
 1978 Risorgimento e società nei canti popolari siciliani introduction by :it:Luigi Maria Lombardi Satriani, :it:Antonino Uccello
 1980 La critica testuale e i problemi della tradizione manoscritta slava medievale, Giacoma Strano

Series: Dialettica e sviluppo 
 1977 Potere e società in Sicilia nella crisi dello stato liberale, :it:Giuseppe Barone - :it:Salvatore Lupo - R. Palidda - M. Saija
 1979 Politica e finanza nell'Italia liberale, :it:Giuseppe Barone
 1979 Partecipazione potere e sviluppo: saggi sulla politica locale, Raimondo Catanzaro

Series: Ventunesimo secolo 
 1984 La musa meccanica preface by Ciro Vitiello, Marco Amendolara
 1988 :it:Dante Maffia, La poesia come azione e come dizione, Luigi Reina

Series: Interventi 
 1978 Riflessioni sulla crisi economica mondiale, Andre Gunder Frank
 1979 Lettera ai militanti comunisti spagnoli, Fernando Arrabal, translation by Beppe Costa
 1979 La causa delle donne, :fr:Giséle Halimi
 1979 Il filosofo-artista, Jean-Noel Vuarnet
 1979 Il giudice, le istituzioni, la crisi dello stato, M.D. :it:Magistratura democratica
 1979 Educazione e utopia nell'opera di H. Marcuse, Flavia Tricomi
 1981 A scuola con il giornale, :it:Graziella Priulla
 1991  Lettere al direttore, Delia Magnani Donadio

Series: Fuori collana 
 1978 Sicilia, guida ai monumenti, Beppe Costa - Luccjo Cammarata
 1984 Chiarezza sui tumori, Antonino Finocchiaro
 1986 Canto d'amore, Beppe Costa
 1986 Procedere con la stella, Grazia Lago
 1988 Killarney- Castiglione di Sicilia: un gemellaggio, AA. VV
 1993 Il giocoliere,Cristina Romano
 1995 Premio Casalotti, antologia poetica, AA. VV.
 1996 d'Amore e d'Altro, Beppe Costa

Series: Pensiero militante 
 1977 Lo sciopero generale e l'organizzazione del proletariato, Fernand Pelloutier
 1978 Scritti sul socialismo, Georges Eugène Sorel
 1978 Revisionismo e ministerialismo in Italia 1899/1902, Alfio Signorelli
 1979 Marxismo e questione agraria, Antonino Criscione
 1981 Condizione della donna - condizione operaia, Etienne Cabet

Related items 
 Beppe Costa
 Dario Bellezza

External links 
 Catalogue region Sardinia
 information network Lilith
 Pellicano's books
 Official site

Italian companies established in 1976
Book publishing companies of Italy
Mass media in Catania